Chinese driving test is an official driving skill test conducted in the People's Republic of China (excluding Hong Kong and Macau) in order to obtain legal driving motor vehicles. It is administered by the traffic administrative department of the public security organ. The contents of the examination subjects and the qualification standards have been uniformly stipulated by the Provisions on the Application for and Use of Motor Vehicle Driving Licenses formulated by the Ministry of Public Security of the People's Republic of China.

The driving test in China includes road traffic safety laws, regulations and related knowledge test subjects (also known as "theory test", referred to as "subject 1"), field driving skills test (commonly known as "stake test", referred to as "subject 2"), road driving skills test and common sense test of safe and civilized driving (commonly known as "road test", referred to as "subject 3"). The examination content and eligibility criteria are unified nationwide, and the corresponding examination items are stipulated according to different driving types.

Test subjects

Subject 1 

The subject 1 (theory test) comprises 100 questions (include single-choice and true-false test) randomly selected from a pool of over 1600. Forty-five minutes will be given in which to answer all the questions and score 90 or more to pass. The question bank will not be officially published as it is the intention of the Ministry of Public Security that students must learn the traffic regulations and understand the intention of the rules rather than memorize answers to questions. After passing the test of subject 1, the learner's driving certificate will be issued as a voucher for learning subsequent subjects and taking the test.

Subject 2 

In subject 2 (stake test), learners driving vehicles to complete multiple project assessments in an open field. Since medium and large passenger cars and trucks are more dangerous than small passenger cars, and require higher technical requirements for drivers, there are more test items for subject 2 of these types. Learners of large buses, tractors, city buses, medium-sized buses and large goods vehicles should score 90 or more, and the learners of other vehicle types should score 80 or more to pass subject 2.

Notes
A1: Large busesA2: TractorsA3: City busesB1: Medium-sized busesB2: Large goods vehiclesC1: Small vehiclesC2: Small automatic shift vehiclesC3: Low-speed goods vehiclesC4: Three-wheelersC5: Small automatic shift passenger vehicles for disabilitiesD: Common three-wheel motorcyclesE: Common two-wheel motorcyclesF: Light motorcyclesM: Wheeled self-move mechanical vehiclesN: Trolley busesP: Tramcars

Subject 3

Road driving skills test 

In road driving skills test, learners need to drive along a fixed route on actual roads and complete the assessment of corresponding items in accordance with regulations. Each test car will be equipped with a safety officer to assess the learner's driving performance.

Common sense test of safe and civilized driving 

Common sense test of safe and civilized driving, is the theory part of subject 3, commonly known as subject 4 (which has never been used as an official name). The test format of subject 4 is similar to subject 1. There are 50 questions including single-choice questions, multiple-choice questions and true-false questions. Each question is 2 points, and score 90 to pass.

After the learner has completed and passed the assessment of all four subjects, a motor vehicle driver's license will be obtained.

References 

Road transport in China